The 1963 North Indian Ocean cyclone season had no bounds, but cyclones tend to form between April and December, with peaks in May and November. The season has no official bounds but cyclones tend to form between April and December. These dates conventionally delimit the period of each year when most tropical cyclones form in the northern Indian Ocean. There are two main seas in the North Indian Ocean—the Bay of Bengal to the east of the Indian subcontinent and the Arabian Sea to the west of India. The official Regional Specialized Meteorological Centre in this basin is the India Meteorological Department (IMD), while the Joint Typhoon Warning Center releases unofficial advisories. An average of four to six storms form in the North Indian Ocean every season with peaks in May and November. Cyclones occurring between the meridians 45°E and 100°E are included in the season by the IMD.

Systems

Deep Depression One

Extremely Severe Cyclonic Storm Two

On May 19, a tropical disturbance formed over the Laccadive Islands, before tracking northwest towards the Arabian peninsula. The system achieved cyclone intensity on May 22. On May 24, a United States Weather Bureau reconnaissance aircraft flew into the  eye of the storm, encountering winds of 193 km/h (120 mph). At Salalah, a strong northerly wind set in during the morning of May 25. Late on the night of the 26th, winds shifted to northeast and heavy rains fell across the region through the morning hours. Skies remained cloudy with periods of rain into May 28.
An estimated 22,000 people were reported to have died, while a further 500,000 were left homeless.

Super Cyclonic Storm Three

One of the strongest cyclones ever recorded in the Northern Indian Ocean. Had the lowest known pressure in the basin until it was surpassed by the 1991 Bangladesh cyclone. Killed 11,520 people in East Pakistan.

Deep Depression Four

Depression Five

Depression Six

Depression Seven

Deep Depression Eight

Heavy rains from the storm triggered severe flooding that killed at least 200 people.

Deep Depression Nine

At least 15 people were killed by flooding triggered by the depression in Orissa.

Depression Ten

Some loss of life was reported in East Pakistan.

Cyclonic Storm Eleven

Very Severe Cyclonic Storm Twelve

Significant damage and flooding took place in India, with some loss of life reported.

Depression Thirteen

Very Severe Cyclonic Storm Fourteen

Depression Fifteen

Cyclonic Storm Sixteen

Deep Depression Seventeen

See also

 North Indian Ocean tropical cyclone
 List of tropical cyclone records
 1963 Atlantic hurricane season
 1963 Pacific hurricane season
 1963 Pacific typhoon season
 Australian region cyclone seasons: 1962–63 1963–64
 South Pacific cyclone seasons: 1962–63 1963–64
 South-West Indian Ocean cyclone seasons: 1962–63 1963–64

References

External links
India Meteorological Department
Joint Typhoon Warning Center 

 
Tropical cyclones in India
1963 in India